Clown & Sunset Aesthetics (CSA) is an interdisciplinary production house founded by Nicolas Jaar and Noah Kraft in 2011.

CSA is the parent company of Clown & Sunset records. CSA hosted its inaugural event at MoMA PS1 on February 5, 2012. The event, titled "From Scratch," was an improvised, interdisciplinary, performance presented by CSA, MoMA PS1 and Pitchfork. "From Scratch" featured performances from Nicolas Jaar, Will Epstein, Sasha Spielberg, filmmaker Ryan Staake and Lizzie Fiedelson.

In March 2012, CSA unveiled its inaugural release, The Prism (CSA001), an innovative new medium for releasing recorded music. The device is a smooth metal cube with two headphone jacks and four buttons. It holds an entire album titled Don't Break My Love. Designed to bring connectivity and a shared listening experience, Don't Break My Love was only released on The Prism, foregoing traditional release outlets like CD, vinyl, and digital.

The Prism featured songs from a number of artists on the Clown & Sunset label in collaboration with each other, including new tracks from Nicolas Jaar. In an interview with the New York Times, Jaar explained, “If we’re going to make a new way to give music to people, it’s going to be imbued with the same type of poetry or the same type of concepts that a song would have.”  The Prism sold out within one week during pre-sales.

References

External links
Clown & Sunset Aesthetics website

American artist groups and collectives
2011 establishments in New York (state)